The 1975 Oklahoma State Cowboys football team represented Oklahoma State University in the Big Eight Conference during the 1975 NCAA Division I football season. In their third season under head coach Jim Stanley, the Cowboys compiled a 7–5 record (3–4 against conference opponents), tied for fifth place in the conference, and outscored opponents by a combined total of 285 to 178.

The team's statistical leaders included Terry Miller with 1,026 rushing yards and 66 points scored, Charlie Weatherbie with 563 passing yards, and Sam Lisle with 384 receiving yards.

The team played its home games at Lewis Field in Stillwater, Oklahoma.

Schedule

Roster
QB Charlie Weatherbie, Jr.              Kenny Walker running back

After the season

The 1976 NFL Draft was held on April 8–9, 1976. The following Cowboys were selected.

References

Oklahoma State
Oklahoma State Cowboys football seasons
Oklahoma State Cowboys football